Emissions trading is a market-based approach to controlling pollution by providing economic incentives for reducing the emissions of pollutants. The concept is also known as cap and trade (CAT) or emissions trading scheme (ETS). Other schemes include sulfur dioxide and other pollutants.

In an emissions trading scheme, a central authority or governmental body allocates or sells a limited number (a "cap") of permits that allow a discharge of a specific quantity of a specific pollutant over a set time period. Polluters are required to hold permits in amount equal to their emissions. Polluters that want to increase their emissions must buy permits from others willing to sell them.

Emissions trading is a type of flexible environmental regulation that allows organizations and markets to decide how best to meet policy targets. This is in contrast to command-and-control environmental regulations such as best available technology (BAT) standards and government subsidies.

Introduction

Pollution is a prime example of a market externality. An externality is an effect of some activity on an entity (such as a person) that is not party to a market transaction related to that activity. Emissions trading is a market-based approach to address pollution. The overall goal of an emissions trading plan is to minimize the cost of meeting a set emissions target.
In an emissions trading system, the government sets an overall limit on emissions, and defines permits (also called allowances), or limited authorizations to emit, up to the level of the overall limit. The government may sell the permits, but in many existing schemes, it gives permits to participants (regulated polluters) equal to each participant's baseline emissions. The baseline is determined by reference to the participant's historical emissions. To demonstrate compliance, a participant must hold permits at least equal to the quantity of pollution it actually emitted during the time period. If every participant complies, the total pollution emitted will be at most equal to the sum of individual limits. Because permits can be bought and sold, a participant can choose either to use its permits exactly (by reducing its own emissions); or to emit less than its permits, and perhaps sell the excess permits; or to emit more than its permits, and buy permits from other participants. In effect, the buyer pays a charge for polluting, while the seller gains a reward for having reduced emissions.

Emissions Trading results in the incorporation of economic costs into the costs of production which incentivizes corporations to consider investment returns and capital expenditure decisions with a model that includes the price of carbon and  greenhouse gases (GHG).

In many schemes, organizations which do not pollute (and therefore have no obligations) may also trade permits and financial derivatives of permits.
In some schemes, participants can bank allowances to use in future periods. In some schemes, a proportion of all traded permits must be retired periodically, causing a net reduction in emissions over time. Thus, environmental groups may buy and retire permits, driving up the price of the remaining permits according to the law of demand. In most schemes, permit owners can donate permits to a nonprofit entity and receive a tax deductions. Usually, the government lowers the overall limit over time, with an aim towards a national emissions reduction target.

According to the Environmental Defense Fund, cap-and-trade is the most environmentally and economically sensible approach to controlling greenhouse gas emissions, the primary cause of global warming, because it sets a limit on emissions, and the trading encourages companies to innovate in order to emit less.

There are active trading programs in several air pollutants. An earlier application was the US national market to reduce acid rain.  The United States now has several regional markets in nitrogen oxides.  For GHG, which cause climate change, carbon emission trade has been introduced in the European Union, China, the UK, Australia, New Zealand, some US states including California and a collection of Northeastern states, and other countries.

History
The efficiency of what later was to be called the "cap-and-trade" approach to air pollution abatement was first demonstrated in a series of micro-economic computer simulation studies between 1967 and 1970 for the National Air Pollution Control Administration (predecessor to the United States Environmental Protection Agency's Office of Air and Radiation) by Ellison Burton and William Sanjour. These studies used mathematical models of several cities and their emission sources in order to compare the cost and effectiveness of various control strategies. Each abatement strategy was compared with the "least-cost solution" produced by a computer optimization program to identify the least-costly combination of source reductions in order to achieve a given abatement goal. In each case it was found that the least-cost solution was dramatically less costly than the same amount of pollution reduction produced by any conventional abatement strategy. Burton and later Sanjour along with Edward H. Pechan continued improving and advancing these computer models at the newly created U.S. Environmental Protection Agency.  The agency introduced the concept of computer modeling with least-cost abatement strategies (i.e., emissions trading) in its 1972 annual report to Congress on the cost of clean air. This led to the concept of "cap and trade" as a means of achieving the "least-cost solution" for a given level of abatement.

The development of emissions trading over the course of its history can be divided into four phases:

 Gestation: Theoretical articulation of the instrument (by Coase, Crocker, Dales, Montgomery etc.) and, independent of the former, tinkering with "flexible regulation" at the US Environmental Protection Agency.
 Proof of Principle: First developments towards trading of emission certificates based on the "offset-mechanism" taken up in Clean Air Act in 1977. A company could get allowance from the Act on a greater amount of emission when it paid another company to reduce the same pollutant.
 Prototype: Launching of a first "cap-and-trade" system as part of the US Acid Rain Program in Title IV of the 1990 Clean Air Act, officially announced as a paradigm shift in environmental policy, as prepared by "Project 88", a network-building effort to bring together environmental and industrial interests in the US.
 Regime formation: branching out from the US clean air policy to global climate policy, and from there to the European Union, along with the expectation of an emerging global carbon market and the formation of the "carbon industry".

In the United States, the acid rain related emission trading system was principally conceived by C. Boyden Gray, a G.H.W. Bush administration attorney. Gray worked with the Environmental Defense Fund (EDF), who worked with the EPA to write the bill that became law as part of the Clean Air Act of 1990. The new emissions cap on NOx and  gases took effect in 1995, and according to Smithsonian magazine, those acid rain emissions dropped 3 million tons that year.

In 1997, the Kyoto Protocol was the first major agreement to reduce greenhouse gases. 38 developed countries (Annex 1 countries) committed themselves to targets and timetables.

Economics of emission trading
It is possible for a country to reduce emissions using a command-and-control approach, such as regulation, direct and indirect taxes. The cost of that approach differs between countries because the Marginal Abatement Cost Curve (MAC)—the cost of eliminating an additional unit of pollution—differs by country.

Pricing the externality
An emissions trading scheme for greenhouse gas emissions (GHGs) works by establishing property rights for the atmosphere. The atmosphere is a global public good, and GHG emissions are an international externality (p. 21). The emissions from all sources of GHGs contribute to the overall stock of GHGs in the atmosphere. In the cap-and-trade variant of emissions trading, a limit on access to a resource (the cap) is defined and then allocated among users in the form of permits. Compliance is established by comparing actual emissions with permits surrendered including any permits traded within the cap. The environmental integrity of emissions trading depends on the setting of the cap, not the decision to allow trading.

Efficiency and equity
For the purposes of analysis, it is possible to separate efficiency (achieving a given objective at lowest cost) and equity (fairness). Economists generally agree that to regulate emissions efficiently, all polluters need to face the full costs of their actions (that is, the full marginal social costs of their actions). Regulation of emissions that is applied only to one economic sector or region drastically reduces the efficiency of efforts to reduce global emissions. There is, however, no scientific consensus over how to share the costs and benefits of reducing future climate change (mitigation of climate change), or the costs and benefits of adapting to any future climate change (see also economics of global warming).

Carbon leakage
A domestic ETS can only regulate the emissions of the country having the trading scheme. In this case, GHG emissions can "leak" (carbon leakage) to another region or sector with less regulation (p. 21). Leakages may be positive, where they reduce the effectiveness of domestic emission abatement efforts. Leakages may also be negative, and increase the effectiveness of domestic abatement efforts (negative leakages are sometimes called spillover) (IPCC, 2007). For example, a carbon tax applied only to developed countries might lead to a positive leakage to developing countries (Goldemberg et al., 1996, pp. 27–28). However, a negative leakage might also occur due to technological developments driven by domestic regulation of GHGs. This can help to reduce emissions even in less regulated regions.

Competitiveness risks
One way of addressing carbon leakage is to give sectors vulnerable to international competition free emission permits (Carbon Trust, 2009). This acts as a subsidy for the sector in question. Free allocation of permits was opposed by the Garnaut Climate Change Review as it considered there were no circumstances that justify it and that governments could deal with market failure or claims for compensation more transparently with the revenue from full auctioning of permits. The economically efficient option would, however, be border adjustments (Neuhoff, 2009; Newbery, 2009). Border adjustments work by setting a tariff on imported goods from less regulated countries. A problem with border adjustments is that they might be used as a disguise for trade protectionism. Some types of border adjustment may also not prevent emissions leakage.

Issuing the permits: 'grandfathering' versus auctions
Tradable emissions permits can be issued to firms within an ETS by two main ways: by free allocation of permits to existing emitters or by auction. Allocating permits based on past emissions is called "grandfathering" (Goldemberg et al., 1996, p. 38). Grandfathering permits, just like the other option of selling (auctioning) permits, sets a price on emissions. This gives permit-liable polluters an incentive to reduce their emissions. However, grandfathering permits can lead to perverse incentives, e.g., a firm that aimed to cut emissions drastically would then be given fewer permits in the future. Allocation may also slow down technological development towards less polluting technologies. The Garnaut Climate Change Review noted that 'grandfathered' permits are not 'free'. As the permits are scarce they have value and the benefit of that value is acquired in full by the emitter. The cost is imposed elsewhere in the economy, typically on consumers who cannot pass on the costs. However, profit-maximising firms receiving free permits will raise prices to customers because of the new, non-zero cost of emissions.

A second method of "grandfathering" is to base allocations on current production of economic goods, rather than historical emissions. Under this method of allocation, government will set a benchmark level of emissions for each good deemed to be sufficiently trade exposed and allocate firms units based on their production of this good. However, allocating permits in proportion to output implicitly subsidises production. The Garnaut Report noted that any method for free permit allocation will have the disadvantages of high complexity, high transaction costs, value-based judgements, and the use of arbitrary emissions baselines.

On the other hand, auctioning permits provides the government with revenues. These revenues could be used to fund low-carbon investment, and also fund cuts in distortionary taxes. Auctioning permits can therefore be more efficient and equitable than allocating permits (Hepburn, 2006, pp. 236–237). Ross Garnaut stated that full auctioning will provide greater transparency and accountability and lower implementation and transaction costs as governments retain control over the permit revenue.

Recycling of revenue from permit auctions could offset a significant proportion of the economy-wide social costs of a cap and trade scheme. As well as reducing tax distortions, Kerr and Cramton (1998) note that auctions of units are more flexible in distributing costs, they provide more incentives for innovation, and they lessen the political arguments over the allocation of economic rents.

Lobbying for free allocation
According to Hepburn (2006, pp. 238–239), "it should be expected that industry will lobby furiously against any auctioning". Hepburn et al. (2006) state that it is an empirical fact that while businesses tend to oppose auctioning of emissions permits, economists almost uniformly recommend auctioning permits. Garnaut notes that the complexity of free allocation, and the large amounts of money involved, encourage non-productive rent-seeking behaviour and lobbying of governments, activities that dissipate economic value.

Coase model

Coase (1960) argued that social costs could be accounted for by negotiating property rights according to a particular objective. Coase's model assumes perfectly operating markets and equal bargaining power among those arguing for property rights. 
In Coase's model, efficiency, i.e., achieving a given reduction in emissions at lowest cost, is promoted by the market system. This can also be looked at from the perspective of having the greatest flexibility to reduce emissions. Flexibility is desirable because the marginal costs, that is to say, the incremental costs of reducing emissions, varies among countries. Emissions trading allows emission reductions to be first made in locations where the marginal costs of abatement are lowest (Bashmakov et al., 2001). Over time, efficiency can also be promoted by allowing "banking" of permits (Goldemberg et al., 1996, p. 30). This allows polluters to reduce emissions at a time when it is most efficient to do so.

Equity
One of the advantages of Coase's model is that it suggests that fairness (equity) can be addressed in the distribution of property rights, and that regardless of how these property rights are assigned, the market will produce the most efficient outcome. In reality, according to the held view, markets are not perfect, and it is therefore possible that a trade off will occur between equity and efficiency (Halsnæs et al., 2007).

Trading
In an emissions trading system, permits may be traded by emitters who are liable to hold a sufficient number of permits in system. Some analysts argue that allowing others to participate in trading, e.g., private brokerage firms, can allow for better management of risk in the system, e.g., to variations in permit prices (Bashmakov et al., 2001). It may also improve the efficiency of system. According to Bashmakov et al. (2001), regulation of these other entities may be necessary, as is done in other financial markets, e.g., to prevent abuses of the system, such as insider trading.

Incentives and allocation
Emissions trading gives polluters an incentive to reduce their emissions. However, there are possible perverse incentives that can exist in emissions trading. Allocating permits on the basis of past emissions ("grandfathering") can result in firms having an incentive to maintain emissions. For example, a firm that reduced its emissions would receive fewer permits in the future (IMF, 2008, pp. 25–26). There are costs that emitters do face, e.g., the costs of the fuel being used, but there are other costs that are not necessarily included in the price of a good or service. These other costs are called external costs (Halsnæs et al., 2007). This problem can also be criticized on ethical grounds, since the polluter is being paid to reduce emissions (Goldemberg et al., 1996, p. 38). On the other hand, a permit system where permits are auctioned rather than given away, provides the government with revenues. These revenues might be used to improve the efficiency of overall climate policy, e.g., by funding energy efficiency programs (ACEEE 2019) or reductions in distortionary taxes (Fisher et al., 1996, p. 417).

In Coase's model of social costs, either choice (grandfathering or auctioning) leads to efficiency. In reality, grandfathering subsidizes polluters, meaning that polluting industries may be kept in business longer than would otherwise occur. Grandfathering may also reduce the rate of technological improvement towards less polluting technologies (Fisher et al., 1996, p. 417).

William Nordhaus argues that allocations cost the economy as they cause the under utilisation an efficient form of taxation. Nordhaus argues that normal income, goods or service taxes distort efficient investment and consumption, so by using pollution taxes to generate revenue an emissions scheme can increase the efficiency of the economy.

Form of allocation

The economist Ross Garnaut states that permits allocated to existing emitters by 'grandfathering' are not 'free'. As the permits are scarce they have value and the benefit of that value is acquired in full by the emitter. The cost is imposed elsewhere in the economy, typically on consumers who cannot pass on the costs.

Market and least-cost

Some economists have urged the use of market-based instruments such as emissions trading to address environmental problems instead of prescriptive "command-and-control" regulation. Command and control regulation is criticized for being insensitive to geographical and technological differences, and therefore inefficient; however, this is not always so, as shown by the WWII rationing program in the U.S. in which local and regional boards made adjustments for these differences.

After an emissions limit has been set by a government political process, individual companies are free to choose how or whether to reduce their emissions. Failure to report emissions and surrender emission permits is often punishable by a further government regulatory mechanism, such as a fine that increases costs of production. Firms will choose the least-cost way to comply with the pollution regulation, which will lead to reductions where the least expensive solutions exist, while allowing emissions that are more expensive to reduce.

Under an emissions trading system, each regulated polluter has flexibility to use the most cost-effective combination of buying or selling emission permits, reducing its emissions by installing cleaner technology, or reducing its emissions by reducing production. The most cost-effective strategy depends on the polluter's marginal abatement cost and the market price of permits. In theory, a polluter's decisions should lead to an economically efficient allocation of reductions among polluters, and lower compliance costs for individual firms and for the economy overall, compared to command-and-control mechanisms.

Measuring, reporting, verification and enforcement

Assuring compliance with an emissions trading scheme requires measuring, reporting and verification (MRV). These measurements are reported to a regulator. For greenhouse gases, all trading countries maintain an inventory of emissions at national and installation level; in addition, trading groups within North America maintain inventories at the state level through The Climate Registry. For trading between regions, these inventories must be consistent, with equivalent units and measurement techniques.

In some industrial processes, emissions can be physically measured by inserting sensors and flowmeters in chimneys and stacks, but many types of activity rely on theoretical calculations instead of measurement. Depending on local legislation, measurements may require additional checks and verification by government or third party auditors, prior or post submission to the local regulator.

Enforcement methods include fines and sanctions for polluters that have exceeded their allowances. Concerns include the cost of MRV and enforcement, and the risk that facilities may lie about actual emissions.

Pollution markets 
An emission license directly confers a right to emit pollutants up to a certain rate.
In contrast, a pollution license for a given location confers the right to emit pollutants at a rate which will cause no more than a specified increase at the pollution-level. For concreteness, consider the following model.

 There are  agents each of which emits  pollutants.
 There are  locations each of which suffers pollution .
 The pollution is a linear combination of the emissions.

As an example, consider three countries along a river (as in the fair river sharing setting).

 Pollution in the upstream country is determined only by the emission of the upstream country: .
 Pollution in the middle country is determined by its own emission and by the emission of country 1: .
 Pollution in the downstream country is the sum of all emissions: .

So the matrix  in this case is a triangular matrix of ones.

Each pollution-license for location  permits its holder to emit pollutants that will cause at most this level of pollution at location . Therefore, a polluter that affects water quality at a number of points has to hold a portfolio of licenses covering all relevant monitoring-points. In the above example, if country 2 wants to emit a unit of pollutant, it should purchase two permits: one for location 2 and one for location 3.

Montgomery shows that, while both markets lead to efficient license allocation, the market in pollution-licenses is more widely applicable than the market in emission-licenses.

International emissions trading

Example
Emissions trading through Gains from Trade can be more beneficial for both the buyer and the seller than a simple emissions capping scheme.

Consider two European countries, such as Germany and Sweden. Each can either reduce all the required amount of emissions by itself or it can choose to buy or sell in the market.

Suppose Germany can abate its CO2 at a much cheaper cost than Sweden, i.e. MACS > MACG where the MAC curve of Sweden is steeper (higher slope) than that of Germany, and RReq is the total amount of emissions that need to be reduced by a country.

On the left side of the graph is the MAC curve for Germany. RReq is the amount of required reductions for Germany, but at RReq the MACG curve has not intersected the market emissions permit price of CO2 (market permit price = P = λ). Thus, given the market price of CO2 allowances, Germany has potential to profit if it abates more emissions than required.

On the right side is the MAC curve for Sweden. RReq is the amount of required reductions for Sweden, but the MACS curve already intersects the market price of CO2 permits before RReq has been reached. Thus, given the market price of CO2 permits, Sweden has potential to make a cost saving if it abates fewer emissions than required internally, and instead abates them elsewhere.

In this example, Sweden would abate emissions until its MACS intersects with P (at R*), but this would only reduce a fraction of Sweden's total required abatement.

After that it could buy emissions credits from Germany for the price P (per unit). The internal cost of Sweden's own abatement, combined with the permits it buys in the market from Germany, adds up to the total required reductions (RReq) for Sweden. Thus Sweden can make a saving from buying permits in the market (Δ d-e-f). This represents the "Gains from Trade", the amount of additional expense that Sweden would otherwise have to spend if it abated all of its required emissions by itself without trading.

Germany made a profit on its additional emissions abatement, above what was required: it met the regulations by abating all of the emissions that was required of it (RReq). Additionally, Germany sold its surplus permits to Sweden, and was paid P for every unit it abated, while spending less than P. Its total revenue is the area of the graph (RReq 1 2 R*), its total abatement cost is area (RReq 3 2 R*), and so its net benefit from selling emission permits is the area (Δ 1-2-3) i.e. Gains from Trade

The two R* (on both graphs) represent the efficient allocations that arise from trading.
 Germany: sold (R* - RReq) emission permits to Sweden at a unit price P.
 Sweden bought emission permits from Germany at a unit price P.

If the total cost for reducing a particular amount of emissions in the Command Control scenario is called X, then to reduce the same amount of combined pollution in Sweden and Germany, the total abatement cost would be less in the Emissions Trading scenario i.e. (X — Δ 123 - Δ def).

The example above applies not just at the national level, but also between two companies in different countries, or between two subsidiaries within the same company.

Applying the economic theory
The nature of the pollutant plays a very important role when policy-makers decide which framework should be used to control pollution. CO2 acts globally, thus its impact on the environment is generally similar wherever in the globe it is released. So the location of the originator of the emissions does not matter from an environmental standpoint.

The policy framework should be different for regional pollutants (e.g. SO2 and NOx, and also mercury) because the impact of these pollutants may differ by location. The same amount of a regional pollutant can exert a very high impact in some locations and a low impact in other locations, so it matters where the pollutant is released. This is known as the Hot Spot problem.

A Lagrange framework is commonly used to determine the least cost of achieving an objective, in this case the total reduction in emissions required in a year. In some cases, it is possible to use the Lagrange optimization framework to determine the required reductions for each country (based on their MAC) so that the total cost of reduction is minimized. In such a scenario, the Lagrange multiplier represents the market allowance price (P) of a pollutant, such as the current market price of emission permits in Europe and the USA.

Countries face the permit market price that exists in the market that day, so they are able to make individual decisions that would minimize their costs while at the same time achieving regulatory compliance. This is also another version of the Equi-Marginal Principle, commonly used in economics to choose the most economically efficient decision.

Prices versus quantities, and the safety valve 

There has been longstanding debate on the relative merits of price versus quantity instruments to achieve emission reductions.

An emission cap and permit trading system is a quantity instrument because it fixes the overall emission level (quantity) and allows the price to vary. Uncertainty in future supply and demand conditions (market volatility) coupled with a fixed number of pollution permits creates an uncertainty in the future price of pollution permits, and the industry must accordingly bear the cost of adapting to these volatile market conditions. The burden of a volatile market thus lies with the industry rather than the controlling agency, which is generally more efficient. However, under volatile market conditions, the ability of the controlling agency to alter the caps will translate into an ability to pick "winners and losers" and thus presents an opportunity for corruption.

In contrast, an emission tax is a price instrument because it fixes the price while the emission level is allowed to vary according to economic activity. A major drawback of an emission tax is that the environmental outcome (e.g. a limit on the amount of emissions) is not guaranteed. On one hand, a tax will remove capital from the industry, suppressing possibly useful economic activity, but conversely, the polluter will not need to hedge as much against future uncertainty since the amount of tax will track with profits. The burden of a volatile market will be borne by the controlling (taxing) agency rather than the industry itself, which is generally less efficient. An advantage is that, given a uniform tax rate and a volatile market, the taxing entity will not be in a position to pick "winners and losers" and the opportunity for corruption will be less.

Assuming no corruption and assuming that the controlling agency and the industry are equally efficient at adapting to volatile market conditions, the best choice depends on the sensitivity of the costs of emission reduction, compared to the sensitivity of the benefits (i.e., climate damage avoided by a reduction) when the level of emission control is varied.

Because there is high uncertainty in the compliance costs of firms, some argue that the optimum choice is the price mechanism. However, the burden of uncertainty cannot be eliminated, and in this case it is shifted to the taxing agency itself.

The overwhelming majority of climate scientists have repeatedly warned of a threshold in atmospheric concentrations of carbon dioxide beyond which a run-away warming effect could take place, with a large possibility of causing irreversible damage. With such a risk, a quantity instrument may be a better choice because the quantity of emissions may be capped with more certainty. However, this may not be true if this risk exists but cannot be attached to a known level of greenhouse gas (GHG) concentration or a known emission pathway.

A third option, known as a safety valve, is a hybrid of the price and quantity instruments. The system is essentially an emission cap and permit trading system but the maximum (or minimum) permit price is capped. Emitters have the choice of either obtaining permits in the marketplace or buying them from the government at a specified trigger price (which could be adjusted over time). The system is sometimes recommended as a way of overcoming the fundamental disadvantages of both systems by giving governments the flexibility to adjust the system as new information comes to light. It can be shown that by setting the trigger price high enough, or the number of permits low enough, the safety valve can be used to mimic either a pure quantity or pure price mechanism.

All three methods are being used as policy instruments to control greenhouse gas emissions: the EU-ETS is a quantity system using the cap and trading system to meet targets set by National Allocation Plans; Denmark has a price system using a carbon tax (World Bank, 2010, p. 218), while China uses the CO2 market price for funding of its Clean Development Mechanism projects, but imposes a safety valve of a minimum price per tonne of CO2.

Comparison with other methods of emission reduction
Cap and trade is the textbook example of an emissions trading program. Other market-based approaches include baseline-and-credit, and pollution tax. They all put a price on pollution (for example, see carbon price), and so provide an economic incentive to reduce pollution beginning with the lowest-cost opportunities. By contrast, in a command-and-control approach, a central authority designates pollution levels each facility is allowed to emit.  Cap and trade essentially functions as a tax where the tax rate is variable based on the relative cost of abatement per unit, and the tax base is variable based on the amount of abatement needed.

Baseline and credit 
In a baseline and credit program, polluters can create permits, called credits or offsets, by reducing their emissions below a baseline level, which is often the historical emissions level from a designated past year. Such credits can be bought by polluters that have a regulatory limit.

Pollution tax

Emissions fees or environmental tax is a surcharge on the pollution created while producing goods and services. For example, a carbon tax is a tax on the carbon content of fossil fuels that aims to discourage their use and thereby reduce carbon dioxide emissions. The two approaches are overlapping sets of policy designs. Both can have a range of scopes, points of regulation, and price schedules. They can be fair or unfair, depending on how the revenue is used. Both have the effect of increasing the price of goods (such as fossil fuels) to consumers.  A comprehensive, upstream, auctioned cap-and-trade system is very similar to a comprehensive, upstream carbon tax. Yet, many commentators sharply contrast the two approaches.

The main difference is what is defined and what derived. A tax is a price control, while a cap-and-trade system is a quantity control instrument. That is, a tax is a unit price for pollution that is set by authorities, and the market determines the quantity emitted; in cap and trade, authorities determine the amount of pollution, and the market determines the price. This difference affects a number of criteria.

Responsiveness to inflation: Cap-and-trade has the advantage that it adjusts to inflation (changes to overall prices) automatically, while emissions fees must be changed by regulators.

Responsiveness to cost changes: It is not clear which approach is better. It is possible to combine the two into a safety valve price: a price set by regulators, at which polluters can buy additional permits beyond the cap.

Responsiveness to recessions: This point is closely related to responsiveness to cost changes, because recessions cause a drop in demand. Under cap and trade, the emissions cost automatically decreases, so a cap-and-trade scheme adds another automatic stabilizer to the economy—in effect, an automatic fiscal stimulus. However, a lower pollution price also results in reduced efforts to reduce pollution. If the government is able to stimulate the economy regardless of the cap-and-trade scheme, an excessively low price causes a missed opportunity to cut emissions faster than planned. Instead, it might be better to have a price floor (a tax). This is especially true when cutting pollution is urgent, as with greenhouse gas emissions. A price floor also provides certainty and stability for investment in emissions reductions: recent experience from the UK shows that nuclear power operators are reluctant to invest on "un-subsidised" terms unless there is a guaranteed price floor for carbon (which the EU emissions trading scheme does not presently provide).

Responsiveness to uncertainty: As with cost changes, in a world of uncertainty, it is not clear whether emissions fees or cap-and-trade systems are more efficient—it depends on how fast the marginal social benefits of reducing pollution fall with the amount of cleanup (e.g., whether inelastic or elastic marginal social benefit schedule).

Other: The magnitude of the tax will depend on how sensitive the supply of emissions is to the price. The permit price of cap-and-trade will depend on the pollutant market. A tax generates government revenue, but full-auctioned emissions permits can do the same. A similar upstream cap-and-trade system could be implemented. An upstream carbon tax might be the simplest to administer. Setting up a complex cap-and-trade arrangement that is comprehensive has high institutional needs.

Command-and-control regulation

Command and control is a system of regulation that prescribes emission limits and compliance methods for each facility or source. It is the traditional approach to reducing air pollution.

Command-and-control regulations are more rigid than incentive-based approaches such as pollution fees and cap and trade. An example of this is a performance standard which sets an emissions goal for each polluter that is fixed and, therefore, the burden of reducing pollution cannot be shifted to the firms that can achieve it more cheaply. As a result, performance standards are likely to be more costly overall. The additional costs would be passed to end consumers.

Trading systems
Apart from the dynamic development in carbon emission trading, other pollutants have also been targeted.

United States

Sulfur dioxide

An early example of an emission trading system has been the sulfur dioxide (SO2) trading system under the framework of the Acid Rain Program of the 1990 Clean Air Act in the U.S. Under the program, which is essentially a cap-and-trade emissions trading system, SO2 emissions were reduced by 50% from 1980 levels by 2007. Some experts argue that the cap-and-trade system of SO2 emissions reduction has reduced the cost of controlling acid rain by as much as 80% versus source-by-source reduction. The SO2 program was challenged in 2004, which set in motion a series of events that led to the 2011 Cross-State Air Pollution Rule (CSAPR).  Under the CSAPR, the national SO2 trading program was replaced by four separate trading groups for SO2 and NOx.
SO2 emissions from Acid Rain Program sources have fallen from 17.3 million tons in 1980 to about 7.6 million tons in 2008, a decrease in emissions of 56 percent.  A 2014 EPA analysis estimated that implementation of the Acid Rain Program avoided between 20,000 and 50,000 incidences of premature mortality annually due to reductions of ambient PM2.5 concentrations, and between 430 and 2,000 incidences annually due to reductions of ground-level ozone.

Nitrogen oxides
In 2003, the Environmental Protection Agency (EPA) began to administer the  Budget Trading Program (NBP) under the  State Implementation Plan (also known as the "NOx SIP Call"). The  Budget Trading Program was a market-based cap and trade program created to reduce emissions of nitrogen oxides (NOx) from power plants and other large combustion sources in the eastern United States. NOx is a prime ingredient in the formation of ground-level ozone (smog), a pervasive air pollution problem in many areas of the eastern United States. The NBP was designed to reduce NOx emissions during the warm summer months, referred to as the ozone season, when ground-level ozone concentrations are highest. In March 2008, EPA again strengthened the 8-hour ozone standard to 0.075 parts per million (ppm) from its previous 0.08 ppm.

Ozone season  emissions decreased by 43 percent between 2003 and 2008, even while energy demand remained essentially flat during the same period. CAIR will result in $85 billion to $100 billion in health benefits and nearly $2 billion in visibility benefits per year by 2015 and will substantially reduce premature mortality in the eastern United States.
NOx reductions due to the  Budget Trading Program have led to improvements in ozone and PM2.5, saving an estimated 580 to 1,800 lives in 2008.

A 2017 study in the American Economic Review found that the  Budget Trading Program decreased  emissions and ambient ozone concentrations. The program reduced expenditures on medicine by about 1.5% ($800 million annually) and reduced the mortality rate by up to 0.5% (2,200 fewer premature deaths, mainly among individuals 75 and older).

Volatile organic compounds

In the United States the Environmental Protection Agency (EPA) classifies Volatile Organic Compounds (VOCs) as gases emitted from certain solids and liquids that may have adverse health effects. These VOCs include a variety of chemicals that are emitted from a variety of different products. These include products such as gasoline, perfumes, hair spray, fabric cleaners, PVC, and refrigerants; all of which can contain chemicals such as benzene, acetone, methylene chloride, freons, formaldehyde.

VOCs are also monitored by the United States Geological Survey for its presence in groundwater supply. The USGS concluded that many of the nations aquifers are at risk to low-level VOC contamination. The common symptoms of short levels of exposure to VOCs include headaches, nausea, and eye irritation. If exposed for an extended period of time the symptoms include cancer and damage to the central nervous system.

China
In an effort to reverse the adverse consequences of air pollution, in 2006, China started to consider a national pollution permit trading system in order to use market-based mechanisms to incentivize companies to cut pollution. This has been based on a previous pilot project called the Industrial  emission trading pilot scheme, which was launched in 2002. Four provinces, three municipalities and one business entity was involved in this pilot project (also known as the 4+3+1 project). They are Shandong, Shanxi, Jiangsu, Henan, Shanghai, Tianjin, Liuzhou and China Huaneng Group, a state-owned company in the power industry. This pilot project did not turn into a bigger scale inter-provincial trading system, but it stimulated numerous local trading platforms.

In 2014, when the Chinese government started considering a national level pollution permit trading system again, there were more than 20 local pollution permit trading platforms. The Yangtze River Delta region as a whole has also run test trading, but the scale was limited. In the same year, the Chinese government proposed establishing a carbon market, focused on CO2 reduction later in the decade, and it is a separate system from the pollution permit trading.

A 2021 study in PNAS found that China's emissions trading system effectively reduced firm emissions despite low carbon prices and infrequent trading. The system reduced total emissions by 16.7% and emission intensity by 9.7%.

Europe 

The EU Emission Trading System was established in the year 2005 - in line with the commitment period of the Kyoto protocol. The scheme was said to cover energy and heat generation industries and around 11,186 plants participated in the first stage. These plants only accounted for 45% of all European emissions at the time. More than 90% of all these allowances were free of cost in both periods to build a strong base of abatements for the future phases. This free allocation resulted in the volume and value of allowances growing three-fold over 2006 with the price moving from €19/tCO₂ in 2005 to its peak of €30/tCO₂ which revealed a new problem. The overallocation of allowances caused the price to drop to €1/tCO₂ in the first few months of 2007 which created market price instabilities for businesses to reinvest in low carbon technologies.

Linked trading systems
Distinct cap-and-trade systems can be linked together through the mutual or unilateral recognition of emissions allowances for compliance. Linking systems creates a larger carbon market, which can reduce overall compliance costs, increase market liquidity and generate a more stable carbon market. Linking systems can also be politically symbolic as it shows willingness to undertake a common effort to reduce GHG emissions. Some scholars have argued that linking may provide a starting point for developing a new, bottom-up international climate policy architecture, whereby multiple unique systems successively link their various systems.

In 2014, the U.S. state of California (which is the world's fifth largest economy if it were a nation, between Germany and the United Kingdom in size) and the Canadian province of Québec successfully linked their systems. In 2015, the provinces of Ontario and Manitoba agreed to join the linked system between Quebec and California. On 22 September 2017, the premiers of Quebec and Ontario, and the Governor of California, signed the formal agreement establishing the linkage.

Renewable energy certificates

Renewable Energy Certificates (occasionally referred to as or "green tags"), are a largely unrelated form of market-based instruments that are used to achieve renewable energy targets, which may be environmentally motivated (like emissions reduction targets), but may also be motivated by other aims, such as energy security or industrial policy.

Criticism 

Emissions trading has been criticised for a variety of reasons.

For example, in the popular science magazine New Scientist, Lohmann (2006) argued that trading pollution allowances should be avoided as a climate stabilization policy for several reasons. First, climate change requires more radical changes than previous pollution trading schemes such as the US SO2 market. It requires reorganizing society and technology to "leave most remaining fossil fuels safely underground". Carbon trading schemes have tended to reward the heaviest polluters with 'windfall profits' when they are granted enough carbon credits to match historic production. Expensive long-term structural changes will not be made if there are cheaper sources of carbon credits which are often available from less developed countries, where they may be generated by local polluters at the expense of local communities.

Distributional effects
The US Congressional Budget Office (CBO, 2009) examined the potential effects of the American Clean Energy and Security Act on US households. This act relies heavily on the free allocation of permits. The Bill was found to protect low-income consumers, but it was recommended that the Bill be made more efficient by reducing welfare provisions for corporations, and more resources be made available for consumer relief.  A cap-and-trade initiative in the U.S. Northeast caused concerns it would be regressive and poorer households would absorb most of the new tax.

Carbon Leakage 
The current state of ETS shows that roughly 22% of global greenhouse emissions are covered by 64 carbon taxes and emission trading systems as of 2021. This means that there are still several member states that have not ratified the Kyoto Protocol. This is a cause of concern for energy intensive industries that are covered by such instruments that claim that there is a loss of competitiveness. Such corporations are thereby forced to take strategic production decisions that contribute to the issue of carbon leakage.

See also

 Acid Rain Retirement Fund
 AP 42 Compilation of Air Pollutant Emission Factors
 Asia-Pacific Emissions Trading Forum
 Cap and Dividend
 Cap and Share
 Carbon credit
 Carbon emissions reporting
 Carbon finance
 Carbon offset
 Carbon tax
 Emission standard
 Energy law
 Flexible Mechanisms
 Green certificate
 Green investment scheme
 Individual and political action on climate change
 Low-carbon economy
 Low carbon power generation / Renewable energy
 Mitigation of global warming
 Mobile emission reduction credit (MERC)
 Personal carbon trading
 Pigovian tax
 Public Smog
 Reducing emissions from deforestation and forest degradation
 Verified Carbon Standard

References

Further reading

External links

 Dr. Daniel Fine of the New Mexico Center for Energy Policy on Cap and Trade
 Emissions Trading and CDM – International Energy Agency
 Greenhouse Gas Emissions Trading and Project-based Mechanisms – Organisation for Economic Co-operation and Development
 US EPA's Acid Rain Program
 [https://web.archive.org/web/20141128104812/http://www.epa.state.il.us/air/erms/ Illinois Emissions Reduction Market System]
 "The Making of a Market-Minded Environmentalist", article by Fred Krupp in Strategy+Business'' (registration required) that articulates some of the reasoning and history behind emissions trading in California

 
Climate change policy
Economics and climate change
Environmental controversies
Contexts for auctions
Governmental auctions